The Reer Nuur (Somali: Reer Nuur) also known as Nuur Yoonis, is a noble northern Somali clan, a sub-division of the Makahiil sub-clan of the Gadabursi clan family.

Overview 
The Reer Nuur are one of the biggest sub-clans of the Gadabursi clan family. Historically, they occupied the buffer zone between the Gadabuursi and Isaaq tribes. Historically, when the clan would meet for political affairs, the Reer Nuur  would be counted as one separate branch, on equal standing with the  Habar Afan, Mahad 'Ase , Aadan Yonis  and the  Jibril Yonis  sub groups of the Gadabursi family .

Distribution 
The Reer Nuur reside in 3 countries, Djibouti, Ethiopia, and Somaliland.

Within Somaliland, the Reer Nuur reside in the Awdal province, and share the Baki District with the Reer Mohammed (Mahad 'Ase) and Habar Afan, although Dilla District is dominated by them. They also inhabit the Borama District .

Within the Maroodi Jeex province, they reside in the Gabiley District, in towns such as Tog Wajaale, El Bardale, and Gabiley. Within the Hargeisa District, they reside in Hargeisa, in the Stadium and State Park neighborhoods.

Within Djibouti, the Reer Nuur reside in Quarter 4 and 5 of Djibouti (city).

Within Ethiopia, the Reer Nuur reside in the Somali Region, specifically in the Awbare district, the most demographically popular region of the Jigjiga Zone. The Reer Nuur historically have grazed up to Jijiga and make up the majority of the inhabitants of the city of Awbare.

History 
As a member of the Dir clan,  the Reer Nuur come under the Makahiil branch of the Gadabuursi. As a member of the Dir clan, the Reer Nuur were a part of the Sultanate of Ifat and the Adal Sultanate. These sultanates were run by the Walashma dynasty, who were originated by the famous Yusuf bin Ahmad al-Kawneyn.

The Reer Nuur also occupy some of the oldest towns of these sultanates, the towns of Amud and Awbare. Which are also known as important historical sites and home to many Somali saints.

In the colonial age, the Reer Nuur were adamantly anti colonization, and refused to join the British (along with other Gadabuursi) against the Dervish movement.

The Balwo style of music and poetry was invented by a member of the Reer Nuur clan, known as Abdi Sinimo. His new style of music also led to the rise of the Heello genre and gave birth to modern Somali music.

Clan Tree 
The Reer Nor claim descent from Dir through Gadabursi, listed below.

 Gadabursi
 Habar Makadur (Makadoor)
 Makahil
 Mussee
 Yuunes (Reer Yuunes)
 Nor Yuunes (Reer Nor)

The sub divisions of the Noor Yuunes:

 Nor Yuunes (Reer Nor)
 Reer Mahmuud
 Abdi Mahamuud
 Xuseen
 Xaad (Buul-xun)
 Shirdoon
 Gabbal 
 Koohi (Bafaad)
 Samatar (Bafaad)
 Bahdoon Samatar
 Ali
 Raage
 Xergeeye
 Khayre (bah-caso)
 Bahdoon (bah-caso)
 Samatar-yare (bah-caso)
 Dhaabur (bah-caso)
 Cismaan (Reer – Cismaan)
 Halas Mahmuud
 Cumar Halas
 Husien Omar
 Farah Omar
 Afi Omar
 Gelleh Omar
 Roble Omar
 Guled Halas
 Samatar Guled
 Xildiid Guled(Xareed-Qoobbuur)
 Dhidar Guled
 Muse Halas
 Hiraab Halas
 Cali Halas
 Hassan Mahmuud (Nimidoor)
 Hufane Mahmuud (Nimidoor)
 Roble Mahmuud (Ba-Jibra’en)
 Mohamed Mahmuud (Ba-Jibra’en)
 Reer Farah
 Ibrahim Farah
 Guled Ibraahim
 Amare Guled
 Xergeeye Amare
 Faarah Amare  
 Shirwac Guled
 Gaboobe Shirwac 
 Xirsi Shirwac 
 Samatar Shirwac
 Geedi Shirwac
 Geeldoon Shirwac
 Abrar Guled 
 Rooble Guled
 Gaade Ibraahim
 Meecaad Gaade
 Loodoon Gaade
 Bahdoon Gaade
 Bare Ibraahim
 Gabdoon Bare
 Meecaad Gabdoon (Gurey)
 sareeye Gabdoon
 Samatar Gabdoon (Qabile)
 Magan Gabdoon
 Waadhawr Magan (Reer wadheer)
 Abdillahi Magan
 Bahdoon Magan
 Samakaab Ibraahim
 Rooble Ibraahim
 Samatar Rooble
 Dadar Ibraahim
 Salah Ibraahim (Dadar)
 Geedi Farah also known as (Gabarmadow)
 Wayteen Geedi
 Cali Geedi
 Mahamed Geedi
 Dabeer Geedi
 Hiraab Geedi
 Reer Ali Abdi

References 

Gadabuursi